Byran Black (1912 – 2002) was a British bobsledder who competed in the late 1930s. At the 1937 FIBT World Championships, he won gold medals in both the two-man and four-man events.

References

Bobsleigh two-man world championship medalists since 1931
Bobsleigh four-man world championship medalists since 1930

British male bobsledders
1912 births
2002 deaths